Girolamo Mattioli (lived 1577) was an Italian painter and engraver of the late-Baroque period, active in Bologna.

He was a pupil of Lorenzo Sabbatini, who also became a follower of the Caracci. His works were distributed among different patrons, particularly in that of the noble family of Zani.

References

16th-century Italian painters
Italian male painters
Painters from Bologna
Italian Baroque painters
Year of death unknown
Year of birth unknown